"Made My Day" is a song by New Zealand musician, Tim Finn, released in August 1983 as the second single from his debut studio album, Escapade. The song reached number 22 in Australia.

Track listing
Australian/New Zealand  7" single (K-9186)
A. "Made My Day" - 3:23
B. "Another Chance" - 4:48

Charts

References

1983 songs
1983 singles
Songs written by Tim Finn
Mushroom Records singles